Joshua Lee Macauley (born 2 March 1991) is an English footballer who plays for Cefn Druids.

Career
Beginning his career as a youth player at Tranmere Rovers, Macauley made his debut for the club on 24 January 2009 in 1–1 draw with Carlisle United as a substitute in place of Charlie Barnett. He joined Colwyn Bay on loan in September 2009 on an initial one-month loan deal. On his signing, Colwyn manager Neil Young stated "Josh will be a big asset for us with his power and pace and he is a goal-scorer". Macauley made his debut for the Seagulls against Rossendale United, scoring twice in a 4–0 win, and went on to score 5 goals in 10 appearances. He later spent time on loan at Conference North side Vauxhall Motors.

Released by Tranmere on his return, Macauley spent time on trial with Chester, managed by his former Colwyn Bay coach Neil Young, and Aberystywth Town before eventually signing for Bala Town. He went on to score six goals in twenty-six Welsh Premier League appearances for the club.

He then went on to join  Prescot Cables before returning to the Welsh league, this time joining Aberystwyth Town in January 2012.

In the summer of 2014 he joined Cefn Druids.

References

External links

1991 births
Living people
English footballers
Association football forwards
Tranmere Rovers F.C. players
Colwyn Bay F.C. players
Vauxhall Motors F.C. players
English Football League players
Bala Town F.C. players
Cymru Premier players
Aberystwyth Town F.C. players
Prescot Cables F.C. players
Cefn Druids A.F.C. players